Lumpkin Hill is a summit in Rome, Georgia. The hill is considered to be one of the Seven Hills of Rome, Georgia.

The summit was named for John Henry Lumpkin, who is also buried on the hill. In 1956, Lumpkin Hill's peak was leveled during the construction of Turner McCall Boulevard.

References

Mountains of Floyd County, Georgia
Mountains of Georgia (U.S. state)